The FIS Nordic Combined World Cup is a Nordic combined competition organized yearly by International Ski Federation, representing the highest level in international competition for this sport. It was first arranged for the 1983–84 season. Team event was first time held in 1999–00 season. The women's inaugural competition was the 2020-21 season. The FIS race director is a Norwegian ex ski jumper and ex world record holder Lasse Ottesen.

Standings
The table below shows the three highest ranked skiers for each world cup season.

Men

Overall

Sprint

Nations Cup

Women

Overall

Nations Cup

Statistics

Wins

Podiums

Starts

See also
FIS Nordic World Ski Championships

References

 
Nordic combined competitions
Skiing world competitions
Recurring sporting events established in 1983
Nordic Combined
Nordic Combined